Hanwha Life Insurance Co., Ltd. is a life insurance company in South Korea. It is part of the Hanwha Group.

Hanwha Life Insurance is South Korea's second largest life insurance company with assets of 81 trillion won as of November 2013. It employs 28,000 financial planners and other employees. As of January 2014, it operates seven local headquarters, 65 regional offices and 605 branches.

History 
Founded on September 9, 1946 as Korea Life Insurance, Hanwha Life Insurance Co., Ltd. is based in Hanwha Finance Center 63 in Yeouido, a landmark building of Seoul. Korea Life Insurance changed its name to Hanwha Life Insurance in October 2012.

Products 
Hanwha Life Insurance's main products include Whole Life Insurance and Critical Illness Insurance; savings-type insurance, including Annuity; and others. In addition, Hanwha Life Insurance serves individual asset management through trust commodities. It also sells retirement pension, accident and health insurance and group insurance to companies, and has sales channels including individual agents, Bancassurance through agencies of banks, and an internet sales channel, Onsure.

Culture 
Hanwha Life Insurance has an esports team, Hanwha Life Esports, that competes in League of Legends Champions Korea.

References

External links 
  

Daehan Life Insurance
Insurance companies of South Korea
Financial services companies established in 1946
Companies listed on the Korea Exchange
Yeongdeungpo District
Companies based in Seoul
1946 establishments in Korea
Life insurance companies